Theobald is a Germanic dithematic name, composed from the elements  theod- "people" and bald "bold". The name arrived in England with the Normans.

The name occurs in many spelling variations, including Theudebald, Diepold, Theobalt, Tybalt; in French Thibaut, Thibault, Thibeault, Thiébaut, etc.; in Italian Tebaldo; in Spanish and Portuguese Teobaldo; in Irish Tiobóid; in Czech Děpolt; and in Hungarian Tibold.

People called Theobald include:

Saint Theobald of Dorat (990–1070), French saint
Saint Theobald of Marly (died 1247), French saint and Cistercian abbot
Saint Theobald of Provins (1033–1066), French hermit and saint
Theobald of Langres (12th century), number theorist
Theobald I, Duke of Lorraine (c. 1191–1220), the Duke of Lorraine (1213–1220)
Theobald II, Duke of Lorraine (1263–1312), the Duke of Lorraine (1303–1312)
Theobald I, Count of Blois (913–975), the first Count of Blois, Chartres, and Châteaudun, as well as Count of Tours
Theobald II of Blois (c. 985–1004), eldest son and heir of Odo I, Count of Blois, and Bertha of Burgundy
Theobald III, Count of Blois (1012–1089), also known as Theobald I of Champagne, count of Blois, Meaux and Troyes
Theobald II, Count of Champagne (1090–1152), also known as Theobald IV of Blois (1090–1152), Count of Blois and of Chartres as Theobald IV (1102–1152) and Count of Champagne and of Brie as Theobald II 1125–1152
Theobald III, Count of Champagne (1179–1201), Count of Champagne (1197–1201) 
Theobald IV of Champagne (1201–1253), also known as Theobald I of Navarre, Count of Champagne (1201–1253) and King of Navarre (1234–1253)
Theobald V of Champagne (c. 1239–1270), also known as Theobald II of Navarre, Count of Champagne and Brie (as Theobald V) and King of Navarre (1253–1270)
Theobald of Bec (c. 1090–1161), Archbishop of Canterbury (1138–1161)
Theobald, Bishop of Liège (died 1312), ruler of Liège (1302–1312)
Theobald von Bethmann Hollweg (1856–1921), German politician and statesman who served as Chancellor of the German Empire (1909–1917)
Theobald Mathew (temperance reformer) (1790–1856), Irish temperance reformer
Theobald Mathew (legal humourist) (1866–1939), English barrister and legal humourist
Theobald Mathew (Director of Public Prosecutions), (1898–1964) English Director of Public Prosecutions
Theobald Mathew (officer of arms) (1942–1998), English officer of arms
Theobald Stein (1829–1901), Danish sculptor
Theobald Wolfe Tone (1763–1798), Irish revolutionary figure and  leader of the 1798 United Irishmen's rising

Surname
Daniel Theobald (born 1975), Founder and Chairman of Vecna Robotics, co-founder of Vecna Technologies; co-founder and President of MassRobotics; inventor of the Battlefield Extraction-Assist Robot
David Theobald (born 1978), English football (soccer) player 
Densill Theobald (born 1982), Trinidadian football (soccer) player 
Frederick Vincent Theobald (1868–1930), British entomologist
Hilda Theobald (1901–1985), English artist
James Theobald (1688-1759), Natural historian, merchant and antiquary
James Theobald (1829–1894), English politician
Karl Theobald (born 1969), English stand-up comedian and actor
Lewis Theobald (1688–1744), British textual editor and author, an 18th-century editor of Shakespeare
Nichola Theobald, English film, television and voice-over actress, television presenter, and fashion model
Nicolas Théobald (1903-1981) lorrain and French geologist, paleontologist and professor of geology at university of Besançon.
Robert Theobald (1929–1999), American economist and futurist
Robert Alfred Theobald (1884–1957), American admiral
William Theobald (1829–1908), British malacologist and naturalist

Places
Theobald, Santa Fe, Argentina
Theobald's Road, Bloomsbury, London, named for 
Theobald's Palace, Hertfordshire

See also
Theobold

Given names
Surnames
Germanic names
Germanic given names
German masculine given names
Surnames of German origin
Surnames of British Isles origin